Kevin Dale Donnalley (born January 17, 1958) is a former American football player and coach.  He played professionally as a defensive back for one season, in 1981, with the New England Patriots of the National Football League (NFL)
He served as the head football coach at Fort Lewis College from 1992 to 1993, compiling a record of 2–18.

Head coaching record

References

External links
 

1958 births
Living people
American football defensive backs
Fort Lewis Skyhawks football coaches
Montana State Bobcats football coaches
New England Patriots players
North Dakota State Bison football coaches
North Dakota State Bison football players
People from Red Wing, Minnesota
Sportspeople from Warren, Ohio
Players of American football from Minnesota